This article contains information on rugby league played in 2006. The season commenced with the World Club Challenge in England in February and concluded with the Tri-Nations Final in Australia in November.

January

World Club Challenge

Bradford Bulls won the one-off match against Wests Tigers 30–10 at Galpharm Stadium, Huddersfield.

February

National Rugby League trial matches

Week 1
Brisbane def. Nth Qld 36–4. Rockhampton, NSW. 11/2/2006. Report
Canberra def. New Zealand 28–16. Auckland, New Zealand. Report
Melbourne def. Parramatta 38–18. Ballina, NSW. 11/2/2006 report

Week 2
South Sydney Rabbitohs and the St George Illawarra Dragons played their annual Charity Shield match. The Rabbitohs narrowly took the shield with a score of 14–12, while most of the Dragons' top grade players were being rested on the bench in preparation for weeks to come.

Other results from this week of trials included:
Brisbane def. Canberra 28–20. Port Macquarie, NSW.
Cronulla def. Canterbury 34–30. Mollymook, NSW.
Nth Qld def. New Zealand 26–10. Cairns, Qld. Crowd: c. 15,000.
Parramatta def. Melbourne 30–24. Exies Oval, Griffith, NSW. Crowd: 6,831.
Penrith def. Newcastle 38–30. Alice Springs, NT.
Sydney def. Manly 44–14. Central Coast Stadium, Gosford, NSW. Crowd: c. 10,000.

Week 3
Manly def. Wests 42–18. Brookvale Oval, Sydney, NSW.
Melbourne def. Brisbane 58–10. Toowoomba Stadium, Toowoomba, QLD.
New Zealand def. Canterbury 24–20. Carrara Stadium, Gold Coast, Qld.
Newcastle def. Cronulla 22–4
North Queensland def. Souths 42–0
Penrith def. Parramatta 26–14. Regional Stadium, Port Macquarie, NSW.
Sydney def. St George Illawarra 16–12. WIN Stadium, Wollongong, NSW.

May
5 - Brisbane, Australia: The 2006 ANZAC Test is played at Suncorp Stadium between Australia and New Zealand is won by the Kangaroos 50-12.
12 - Dubbo, Australia: In the annual City vs Country Origin match, Country NSW defeated City NSW 12–10 at Apex Oval before a crowd of 11,423.

July

5 July - Telstra Dome, Melbourne, Australia before a crowd of 54,833 the 2006 State of Origin series concludes with Queensland defeating New South Wales

August
3rd – Australia: Rugby league film Footy Legends is released.

September
21st – Sydney, Australia: The 8th annual Tom Brock Lecture, entitled The Stuff of Dreams, or the Dream Stuffed? Rugby League, Media Empires, Sex Scandals, and Global Plays is delivered by Dr. David Rowe.

October

The Brisbane Broncos win the NRL Premiership after defeating first-placed Melbourne in the Grand Final.

November

8: Brisbane, Australia – The Great Britain national rugby league team plays against Australia for the last time, losing 10–33 at Suncorp Stadium before a crowd of 44,358

Regular season matches

Super League XI

The Super League kicked off the weekend after the World Club Challenge with Hull F.C. defeating the newly promoted Castleford Tigers 42–18. This season saw the entry of Catalans Dragons, who are the first French team to compete since the demise of Paris Saint-Germain at the end of Super League II. The regular season would finish with St. Helens taking out the minor premiership and the Castleford Tigers being relegated to division one. The Super League Grand Final saw St. Helens claim a twelve championship with victory over Hull F.C. at Old Trafford in front of 73,000.

National Rugby League – Season 2006

The 99th season of first grade rugby league in Australia was controversial before competition even began. The New Zealand Warriors were fined and penalised four competition points for salary cap breaches in 2004 and 2005. They were fined and started the season on -4 points. The season began on Friday, 10 March, when defending premiers Wests Tigers and early favourites St George Illawarra Dragons played at Telstra Stadium. Melbourne Storm won the Minor Premiership, however, lost to the Brisbane Broncos in the Grand Final in front of over 79,000.

Powergen Challenge Cup 2006

The Powergen Rugby League Challenge Cup is the most prestigious knock-out competition in the world of Rugby League and the 2006 competition saw over a hundred clubs competing from countries including England, France, Russia, Scotland and Wales. The final would see St. Helens take victory 41–12 over the Huddersfield Giants at Twickenham Stadium in front of 65,187.

UK National Leagues

The National Leagues kicked off on 7 April. There are three divisions, and the top team in National One has the opportunity to enter SuperLeague, subject to minimum standards.

AMNRL – Season 2006

The American National Rugby League kicked off on Wednesday 17 June with the Glen Mills Bulls defeating the Philadelphia Fight 48–26. This season saw the entry of three new competition teams the Jacksonville Axemen, New Haven Warriors and the Boston Braves. At the conclusion of the AMNRL regular season, the Glen Mills Bulls won the Minor Premiership, only to lose lost to the Connecticut Wildcats in the Grand Final Championship match in front of over 2,500.

International

Summary

Tests

Internationals

'A'/'B' internationals

Other international teams

Results

Sources

Trial matches
 "Noble hails Bradford team effort", BBC website. Retrieved 8 May 2006
 "2006 Charity Shield", Rleague.com website. Retrieved 8 May 2006
 "2006 NRL Trials", Rleague.com website. Retrieved 8 May 2006

State of Origin
 "Ring-in Finch saves the day for Blues", Sydney Morning Herald website. Retrieved 25 May 2006

International
 "Lionhearts Jet Off to Serbia", England Lionhearts website. Retrieved 8 May 2006
 "Serbia 6 England Lionhearts 46", England Lionhearts website. Retrieved 8 May 2006
 "Serbia 4 England Lionhearts 50", England Lionhearts website. Retrieved 8 May 2006
 "Aussies crush NZ in Johns finale", BBC website. Retrieved 8 May 2006
 "World Cup European Preliminary Qualifying Tournament – Euro B", Rugby League European Federation website. Retrieved 8 May 2006
 "Pacific Cup 2006 Results", New Zealand Rugby League website. Retrieved 8 May 2006
 "Lions to face Kiwis in June Test", BBC website. Retrieved 8 May 2006
 "Competitions and Results", Rugby League European Federation website. Retrieved 8 May 2006
 "NZ-Great Britain league match 'no Test'", Sydney Morning Herald website. Retrieved 11 May 2006
 "Kiwis insist it's a Test", The Adelaide Advertiser website. Retrieved 12 May 2006
 "Rugby League World Cup 2008 – European Qualifying Group", Rugby League European Federation website. Retrieved 15 May 2006
 "Kiwis Get Caps for XXXX Test", Sporting Life. Retrieved 24 May 2006
 "GB Police Set For Serbia", Rugby League European Federation website. Retrieved 24 May 2006
 "Belgrade Cup", Rugby League European Federation website. Retrieved 25 May 2006
 "Impressive Georgia Outrun Dutch in 2nd Half", Rugby League European Federation website. Retrieved 28 May 2006
 "European Preliminary Qualifying Group – Match 4", Rugby League European Federation website. Retrieved 5 June 2006
 "BARLA set for Italy", British Amateur Rugby League Association website. Retrieved 6 June 2006
 "Upcoming tours", South African Rugby League website. Retrieved 6 June 2006
 "2006 Wales A Fixtures and Results", Cymru Rugby League website. Retrieved 7 June 2006
 "Scottish Wilt Under Irish Heat", Scotland Rugby League website. Retrieved 7 June 2006
 "France Make Historic Trip To Glasgow", Scotland Rugby League website. Retrieved 8 June 2006
 "BARLA convincingly wins their double header against Italy and South Africa", Rugby League European Federation website. Retrieved 12 June 2006
 "Scotland A v. France Federale", Rugby League European Federation website. Retrieved 20 June 2006
 "Euro Development Tri-nations", Rugby League European Federation website. Retrieved 27 June 2006
  "Great Britain 46–14 New Zealand", bbc.co.uk website. Retrieved 28 June 2006.
 "European Federation Development International", Rugby League European Federation website. Retrieved 11 July 2006
 "Wolfhound A v. Lionheart A Match Report", Rugby League Ireland website. Retrieved 19 July 2006.
 "Defensive Heroics Not Enough For 'A' Team", Scotland Rugby League website. Retrieved 19 July 2006.
 "Estonia 24 Germany 38 – Tallinn", Rugby League European Federation website. Retrieved 26 July 2006
 "Rugby League World Cup Pacific Qualifiers Loom", Pacific Magazine Website. Retrieved 13 August 2006.
 "Slavic Cup", Rugby League European Federation website. Retrieved 14 August 2006
 "Bravehearts well beaten by Lionhearts", Scotland Rugby League website. Retrieved 16 August 2006
 "England set for new tournament", bbc.co.uk website. Retrieved 18 August 2006.
"PNG Kumuls to play Australian PM's 13", The National website. Retrieved 23 August 2006.
"Wolfhounds A triumph in Wales", Rugby League Ireland website. Retrieved 23 August 2006.
"Italy overcome a gallant USA team", Italia RL XIII website. Retrieved 23, August 2006.
"New Europe-Pacific tournament for Mate Ma’a Tonga", Matangi Tonga Online, 29 August 2006. Retrieved 29 August 2006.
"RLEF Development Tri-nations", Rugby League European Federation website. Retrieved 4 September 2004.
"England A 30 Wales A 26", Cymru Rugby League website. Retrieved 20 September 2006.

 
Rugby league by year